The 15th District of the Iowa House of Representatives in the state of Iowa.

Current elected officials
Charlie McConkey is the representative currently representing the district.

Past representatives
The district has previously been represented by:
 Dennis L. Freeman, 1971–1973
 Donald Avenson, 1973–1983
 Sue Mullins, 1983–1989
 Dolores Mertz, 1989–2003
 Brian Quirk, 2003–2013
 Mark Brandenburg, 2013–2015
 Charlie McConkey, 2015–present

References

015